Sir Richard John Allison (1869–1958) was a Scottish architect. From 1889 he was associated with the government Office of Works in London (as example The Science Museum), and from 1914 was its Chief Architect.

Selected works
 The Science Museum, London (1919–28)
 The Duveen wing, National Portrait Gallery, London (1933), with J G West.
 The Geological Museum, London
 The Royal Courts of Justice, Belfast (1933), with J G West.
 The British Ambassador's house in Diplomatstaden, Stockholm (1915).

References

20th-century Scottish architects
1869 births
1958 deaths